Anatoli Grigoryevich Evdokimov (17 June 1945 — April 2016) was a Russian former pair skater who represented the Soviet Union in the 1960s and early 1970s. He began skating at the Luzhniki ice rink in Moscow. His partnership with his wife, Tatiana Sharanova, began by 1966. The two finished 5th at the 1967 European Championships in Ljubljana, Yugoslavia, and 8th at the 1967 World Championships in Vienna, Austria. They won silver at the 1966 Prize of Moscow News, gold at the 1967 Prague Skate, and silver at the 1970 Blue Swords.

After retiring from competition, Evdokimov worked for an ice ballet based in Kiev and taught skating at Syuita Kiev. On 15 April 2016, the Ukrainian Figure Skating Federation reported that he had died.

Competitive highlights 
with Sharanova

References 

1945 births
2016 deaths
Russian emigrants to Ukraine
Russian male pair skaters
Soviet male pair skaters
Figure skaters from Moscow
Universiade medalists in figure skating
Universiade silver medalists for the Soviet Union
Competitors at the 1968 Winter Universiade